Ranawa is a village in Sri Lanka. It is located within North Central Province.

See also
List of settlements in North Central Province (Sri Lanka)

External links

Populated places in North Central Province, Sri Lanka